Sir Thomas Monson, 1st Baronet (1565 – 29 May 1641) was an English politician and supporter of King James I.

Background
Sir Thomas was the son of Sir John Monson of South Carlton, Lincolnshire, a past High Sheriff of Lincolnshire. Sir Thomas's younger brother was Admiral Sir William Monson. Thomas was educated at Magdalen College, Oxford, matriculating at the age of fifteen in December 1579, and at Gray's Inn, where he was admitted a student in 1583.

Career
Sir Thomas was appointed a Justice of the Peace in 1592 and High Sheriff of Lincolnshire for 1597 and probably knighted the same year. He then served as a Member of Parliament for Lincolnshire (1597–1598), Castle Rising (1604–1611), and finally Cricklade in 1614.

Under James I Monson thrived. He was made Chancellor of the English jointure lands of the king's wife Anne of Denmark in 1603. He was made Keeper of the Armoury at Greenwich, Master of the Armoury at the Tower of London, and Master Falconer to the King.

He was created a hereditary baronet in 1611, one of the first in the Baronetage of England. But in 1615 his position of trust at the Tower of London brought about a situation which led to his arrest as one of the participators in the 1613 murder of Sir Thomas Overbury. He was eventually released however, after a year in the Tower, his reputation and finances ruined.

Family

He died in 1641 and was buried in South Carlton. He had married Margaret Anderson, the daughter of Sir Edmund Anderson, with whom he had four sons and five daughters. His eldest son and heir was John Monson (1600–1683), a member of parliament under Charles I.

His nephew, William Monson (c. 1607–1678), was created an Irish peer as Viscount Monson of Castlemaine in 1628. Having been a member of the court which tried Charles I the viscount was deprived of his honours and was sentenced to imprisonment for life in 1661.

References 

 
Attribution

1565 births
1641 deaths
Alumni of Magdalen College, Oxford
Baronets in the Baronetage of England
High Sheriffs of Lincolnshire
English MPs 1597–1598
English MPs 1604–1611
English MPs 1614
Members of Parliament for Cricklade
Household of Anne of Denmark